Evan Naji(born October 28, 1988 in Erbil, Iraq), is an Iraqi singer, composer and songwriter.

Discography

Singles
2009: "Redet Ansak"
2011: "Madry Shejah" (Ma Areda La)
2012: "3oud Yhebni"
2013: "Neseet El7enneyah"
2016: "3ala Arrannah"

See also
List of best-selling music artists

References

Living people
1988 births
21st-century Iraqi male singers
Iraqi male singer-songwriters